Tarap may refer to:
 Tarap, Attock, a village and Union Council in the Attock District of Punjab province in Pakistan
 Artocarpus odoratissimus or tarap, a tree in the mulberry and fig family Moraceae
 Tarap (film), a 2006 Pakistani Urdu film
 Tarap (TV series), a 2020 Pakistani TV series